The Ambassador of Australia to Ukraine is an officer of the Australian Department of Foreign Affairs and Trade and the head of the Embassy of the Commonwealth of Australia to Ukraine. The position has the rank and status of an Ambassador Extraordinary and Plenipotentiary and is currently held by Bruce Edwards since October 2020. The embassy is co-located with the Canadian Embassy in Kyiv, but has been temporarily closed due to the 2022 Russian invasion of Ukraine, with Australian officials currently based in eastern Poland and Romania. Since 2020, the ambassador also holds non-resident accreditation for Moldova.

Posting history

Ukraine and Australia have enjoyed diplomatic relations since 1942 when Australia opened channels with the Soviet Union (which included the Ukrainian Soviet Socialist Republic), although independent relations did not occur until the collapse of the Soviet Union and the establishment of a fully independent Ukraine in late 1991. With the dissolution of the Soviet Union in late 1991, Australia acted to recognise the new states of the Commonwealth of Independent States on 26 December 1991. Non-resident accreditation to Ukraine, based with the Australian Embassy in Moscow, was later established from 10 January 1992, with the Australian Ambassador in Moscow, Cavan Hogue, presenting his credentials to the President of Ukraine, Leonid Kravchuk on 9 March 1992. Accreditation was transferred to the new interim embassy established in Kyiv in November 2014 following the 2014 pro-Russian unrest in Ukraine. From 5 November 1992 to the opening of a resident embassy in 2014, Australia maintained a Consulate in Kyiv headed by an Honorary Consul, Serhiy Mykolayovych Berezovenko, a prominent economist and businessman based in the city.

The first resident ambassador, Doug Trappett, who was previously Deputy Head of Mission in Rome, had been sent to Kyiv in December 2014 to deal with matters relating to the controversial downing of Malaysia Airlines Flight 17, which led to the deaths of 27 Australian citizens. Trappett presented his credentials on 14 January 2015.

Although initially considered an interim measure for 12 months, pending the resolution of the conflicts in the region, with the stalemating of various issues and the hardening of Ukrainian-Russian relations, the embassy's term of existence was extended in February 2016 to September 2016. In September 2016, the decision was taken by foreign minister Julie Bishop to extend the embassy's term for a further two years, noting that a continued resident diplomatic presence would allow Australia: "to work alongside their Ukrainian partners in close cooperation and further develop bilateral ties between the two countries."

On 13 February 2022, amid increasing tensions immediately prior to the Russian invasion of Ukraine, the Australian Embassy was relocated from the capital Kyiv to the western Ukrainian city of Lviv. However, on 22 February 2022, a day before the Russian invasion, Foreign Minister Marise Payne directed that all Australian officials were to leave the country and operate from eastern Poland and Romania.

List of ambassadors

See also
Foreign relations of Ukraine
Foreign relations of Australia

References

External links

Australian Embassy, Ukraine

Ukraine
Australia